Banded snake may refer to :

 Snakes of the genus Chamaelycus in the family colubridae
 Snakes of the genus Simoselaps in the family elapidae
 De Vis's banded snake (Denisonia devisi)
 Black-banded trinket snake (Oreocryptophis porphyracea)
 Banded water snake (Nerodia fasciata)
 Brown-banded water snake (Helicops angulatus)
 Banded cat-eyed snake (Leptodeira annulata)
 Many-banded tree snake (Boiga multifasciata)
 White-banded wolf snake (Dinodon septentrionalis)
 Banded kukuri snake (Oligodon arnensis)

Animal common name disambiguation pages